The 2018 Ovo Energy Women's Tour, is the fifth staging of The Women's Tour, a women's cycling stage race held in the United Kingdom. It ran from 13 to 17 June 2018, as part of the 2018 UCI Women's World Tour.

Route

Classification leadership table

See also
 2018 in women's road cycling

Notes

References

External links

2018 UCI Women's World Tour
2018 in women's road cycling
2018 in British women's sport
2018
June 2018 sports events in the United Kingdom